Lori Weitzner is an American textile and product designer. She is the founder and Creative Director of Lori Weitzner Design, Inc., a New-York-based design studio, and the head of the Weitzner Limited brand. She has a jewelry and accessory collection under the brand Lori Weitzner launched in 2019 and is the author of Ode to Color, The Ten Essential Palettes for Living and Design published by HarperCollins.

Career
Weitzner studied design at Syracuse University and earned a BFA in Textiles. After graduating in 1983 she traveled to Europe where she worked as a freelance designer selling to Italian and Swiss fabric makers such as Missoni and Boller Winkler / Schlossberg.  Afterward she returned to New York where she did packaging design for Estée Lauder, Elizabeth Arden and Calvin Klein; product design for Dansk, Rosenthal, Marcel Schurman and Johnson & Johnson; display design for Saks Fifth Avenue, Barneys and Florian Papp; and environmental designs for Lufthansa, amongst others.

In 1993 she began working for world-renowned textile designer Jack Lenor Larsen. With Larsen, Weitzner was given the opportunity to create independently-designed collections that bore her name. Their collaboration produced many celebrated designs, a lot of which are now housed in museums worldwide. In 2007 the Minneapolis Institute of Art honored the pair with a special exhibition under the title "The Jack Lenor Larsen Studio Part II, The Lori Weitzner Years 1992–1995".

In 2000 she began designing fabric and wallpaper for Sahco Hesslein, becoming the first woman and the first American to design for the renowned German textile manufacturer. In 2004 she launched Weitzner Limited, an innovative textile and wall covering company known for combining modern techniques with unconventional materials. Some notable wallpapers include "Newsworthy," made from 100% upcycled newspapers hand-woven together with nylon thread in a similar technique used with grass cloth and finished with a water-based topcoat, "Quarry," made out of super-thin layers of actual rock; and "Magnetism," a wallpaper coated in magnetic minerals. In 2011 Weitzner Limited entered a merger agreement with Pollack Associates, a New York-based textile design company whose founders, like Weitzner, are alumni of Jack Lenor Larsen's studio.

Weitzner's products grace celebrity homes including those of Julianne Moore, Will Ferrell, and Beyoncé, and often appear as costumes and sets for movies such as Gangs of New York, Mission: Impossible and Money Monster. Her designs are also used in such eponymous commercial spaces as Google, Saks Fifth Avenue and Wynn Hotels.

Additionally, Weitzner designs collections for other product categories: passmenterie for Samuel and Sons, rugs for Perennials and West Elm, window shades for Hunter Douglas and gifts, journals and greeting cards for Papyrus.

Weitzner is a celebrated author. A People Magazine "Pick,"  ODE TO COLOR: The Ten Essential Palettes of Living and Design (HarperCollins), Weitzner shares her unique perspective on the uses and significance of color in design. Immersing readers into ten "color worlds," she explores the power that color holds over our tastes, decisions, and moods. As a complement to the book, Lori has developed the ODE TO COLOR Analysis, which guides you to the color world that will best suit your home, enhancing the way you live.

In November 2018 she launched her first "textile-infused" jewelry and accessory line under her own name where she uses many methods of textiles creation and collaborates with artisans around the world to bring these unique and handmade pieces to life.

She writes a bi-monthly column for Hong Kong's Home Journal called Living Well With Color and regularly lectures before audiences around the world on engaging the senses, and finding inspiration in the world around us, both natural and man-made.

Awards and recognition
Weitzner's work belongs to the permanent collections of such museums as Cooper Hewitt, Musee des Arts Decoratifs, the Museum of Architecture and Design, and London's Victoria and Albert Museum, among others. She is the recipient of over 25 prestigious design awards, including several Best of the Year awards from Interior Design Magazine and a nomination for a Chrysler Design Award.

References

Living people
Syracuse University alumni
American textile designers
Year of birth missing (living people)